Yahya Afridi (born 23 January 1965) has been a Justice of the Supreme Court of Pakistan since 28 June 2018.

Justice Afridi was educated in Lahore at Aitchison College and holds a Master of Laws from Jesus College, Cambridge. He interned at Fox & Gibbons in London before returning to Pakistan, where he became an Associate at Orr, Dignam & Co. in Karachi.

References

1965 births
Living people
Justices of the Supreme Court of Pakistan
21st-century Pakistani judges
Afridi people
Aitchison College alumni
University of the Punjab alumni
Alumni of Jesus College, Cambridge
Academic staff of the University of Peshawar
Chief Justices of the Peshawar High Court